Camarhynchus is a genus of birds in the tanager family Thraupidae. All species of Camarhynchus are endemic to the Galápagos Islands, and together with related genera, they are collectively known as Darwin's finches. Formerly classified in the bunting and American sparrow family Emberizidae, more recent molecular genetic studies have shown it to belong in the tanager family.

Taxonomy and species list
The genus Camarhynchus was introduced in 1837 by English ornithologist John Gould, with the large tree finch as the type species. The name combines the Ancient Greek kamara meaning "arch" or "vault" with rhunkhos meaning "bill". The members of the genus form part of a group collectively known as Darwin's finches. Although traditionally placed with the buntings and New World sparrows in the family Emberizidae, molecular phylogenetic studies have shown that Darwin's finches are members of the subfamily Coerebinae within the tanager family Thraupidae. The genus contains five species.

The vegetarian finch (Platyspiza crassirostris) has sometimes been included in this genus.

References

 
Bird genera
Taxonomy articles created by Polbot
Taxa named by John Gould